Nataliya Olehivna Pohrebniak (born 19 February 1988) is a Russian-Ukrainian sprint athlete who specializes in the 100 metres. Pohrebniak (with Yelizaveta Bryzhina, Mariya Ryemyen and Olesya Povh) was part of the Ukrainian women's 4 × 100 m that won gold during the 2010 European Athletics with 42.29 – the fastest time in the world that year. She changed her allegiance to Russia after 2016 and began competing in Russian national competitions in 2019.

Biography
Pohrebnyak was born in the Kharkiv Oblast, and represents the club Dynamo Kharkiv. In the 100 metres she finished fourth at the 2007 European Junior Championships, and won the silver medal at the 2009 European U23 Championships. In the 200 metres she finished seventh at the 2009 European U23 Championships. She also competed at the 2004 and 2006 World Junior Championships and the 2007 and 2009 World Championships, as well as the 2008 Olympic Games. In the Olympic 100 metres race she placed fourth in her first round heat, which normally meant elimination. However, her time of 11.60 was among the ten fastest losing times, resulting in a second round spot. There she failed to qualify for the semi finals as her time of 11.55 was the eighth fastest time in her race.

She won a silver medal at the 2007 European Junior Championships in the 4 x 100 metres relay. At the 2007 World Championships the Ukrainian team failed to finish the race.  At the 2008 Olympic Games the Ukrainian 4 × 100 m team was disqualified.  Disqualification also occurred at the 2004 World Junior Championships.  She competed at the 2009 World Championships without reaching the final.  At the 2009 European U23 Championships the team again failed to finish the race.

Her personal best times are 11.109 seconds in the 100 metres, achieved in 2015; and 22.64 seconds in the 200 metres, achieved in 2016 at the Rio Olympics.

References

1988 births
Living people
People from Kupiansk
Ukrainian female sprinters
Russian female sprinters
Olympic female sprinters
Olympic athletes of Ukraine
Athletes (track and field) at the 2008 Summer Olympics
Athletes (track and field) at the 2012 Summer Olympics
Athletes (track and field) at the 2016 Summer Olympics
Universiade gold medalists in athletics (track and field)
Universiade gold medalists for Ukraine
Medalists at the 2011 Summer Universiade
Medalists at the 2013 Summer Universiade
World Athletics Championships athletes for Ukraine
World Athletics Championships medalists
European Athletics Championships medalists
Sportspeople from Kharkiv Oblast